Palomar Medical Center Escondido is a hospital located in Escondido, California. It is operated by the Palomar Health District (formerly known as Palomar Pomerado Health), which also operates Palomar Medical Center Poway in nearby Poway. Palomar Medical Center Escondido is the only designated trauma center in northern San Diego County.

The first hospital in Downtown Escondido opened in 1950 as Palomar Memorial Hospital. A tower addition, McLeod Tower, was completed in 1974. The hospital was renamed to Palomar Medical Center in 1987. It is now known as Palomar Medical Center Downtown Escondido, which houses psychiatric and rehabilitation wards.

In late 2021 to early 2022, the old hospital campus was slowly demolished and will now be replaced by a mixed use/senior living/apartment complex. To safely take down the building, heavy asbestos abatement was performed by workers as the building was built in the ‘50s and contained asbestos insulation.

References

External links
 Palomar Medical Center
 Palomar Pomerado Health 
 This hospital in the CA Healthcare Atlas A project by OSHPD

Hospitals in San Diego County, California
Escondido, California
Hospitals established in 1950
1950 establishments in California
Organizations based in San Diego County, California
Hospital buildings completed in 1950
Hospital buildings completed in 1974
Hospital buildings completed in 2012
Trauma centers